The Henrico County Open was a golf tournament on the Nationwide Tour from 1993 to 2008. It was played at The Dominion Club in Richmond, Virginia, United States.

The 2008 purse was $500,000, with $90,000 going to the winner.

Winners

Bolded golfers graduated to the PGA Tour via the final Nationwide Tour money list.

External links
PGATOUR.com tournament website

Former Korn Ferry Tour events
Golf in Virginia
Sports in Richmond, Virginia
Recurring sporting events established in 1993
Recurring sporting events disestablished in 2008